Lambrick Park Secondary School is a four-year (grades 9-12) public secondary school located in Saanich, British Columbia, Canada. It is on the traditional lands of the Lekwungen people.

The school, part of Greater Victoria's School District 61, opened for the 1976-77 academic year and had its first graduates in 1978.

Lambrick Park is part of the family of schools that include Torquay Elementary School and Gordon Head Middle School.

Programs
In addition to courses in English, mathematics, history, science and social studies, the school has programs in business and technical education, physical education, fine arts, computing and home economics. Lambrick Park offers four years of French and three years of Spanish instruction. School is in session from 8:55 a.m. to 3:15 p.m.; each class period is 80 minutes long, with four such periods daily Mondays through Thursdays. On Fridays, classes finish early at 1:15 p.m.; each class is shortened to 50 minutes.

There is a school concert choir, a jazz choir, and a band program.

The school also has an active athletic program, with sports including badminton, basketball, baseball, field hockey, golf, tennis, rowing, rugby, soccer, swimming and volleyball, as well as cross-country and track and field. As the school mascot is a lion, the sports teams are generally named either as the Lions or Pride.

Lambrick Park High School also hosts the Diamond for Excellence program. This academy provides on-the-field instruction in baseball and softball skills and in-the-classroom instruction in five specific areas intended to enhance student athletes' knowledge, understanding, and appreciation of the science of sport and training as it applies to baseball and softball.

Notable alumni
Ravi Kahlon, former player on Canada men's national field hockey team, Member of the Legislative Assembly of British Columbia for Delta North (2017-)
Nick Pivetta (born 1993), current Major League Baseball pitcher for the Boston Red Sox
Michael Saunders, former Major League Baseball outfielder (2016 MLB All Star) for the Toronto Blue Jays, and the Seattle Mariners

References

External links
Lambrick Park Secondary School
School District 61
Diamond for Excellence baseball academy

High schools in British Columbia
Educational institutions established in 1976
1976 establishments in British Columbia